The 1968 Southeastern 500 was a NASCAR Grand National Series event that was held on March 17, 1968, at Bristol International Speedway in  Bristol, Tennessee. Highlights of this racing event were later shown on the classic Car and Track television show on most CBS stations.

The transition to purpose-built racecars began in the early 1960s and occurred gradually over that decade.  Changes made to the sport by the late 1960s brought an end to the "strictly stock" vehicles of the 1950s.

Race report
A total distance of 500 laps was accomplished at this event; with Bobby Allison acquiring the last-place position due to stock car engine problems on lap 41. Stan Meserve would fall out with engine failure on lap 54. Driveshaft problems would end Paul Goldsmith's day on lap 60 while terminal vehicle damage would end Jerry Grant's day on lap 72. An accident would claim the vehicle of G.C. Spencer on lap 91 while an oil leak would take Roy Tyner out the race on lap 104.

Clyde Lynn's incredibly disappearing tail end of his vehicle eventually stalled his racing hopes on lap 445. While the first 100 laps of this race event were a David Pearson and Richard Petty show, it would be LeeRoy Yarbrough would compete against Pearson in the closing laps of this event. All 36 of the qualifying drivers were born in the United States of America. Henley Gray would become the lowest-finishing driver to actually complete the event; albeit more than 100 laps behind the lead-lap competitors.

David Pearson would best Richard Petty by a distance of three seconds after racing at each other's throats for more than three hours; Petty drove the last 25 laps of the race without any brakes. More than 19,000 ardent NASCAR followers would see a race marred by eleven caution flags for a duration of 81 laps. Richard Petty's qualifying speed of  would see him blaze through the field during solo qualifying runs. Cale Yarborough would spend some time as the leader of the race before an incident involving the back of his vehicle would end his day of racing on lap 237. Roy Trantham would make his introduction into the NASCAR Cup Series scene in this race while Serge Adams would exit stage left from NASCAR racing after the conclusion of this event. Doug Cooper also enjoyed his final NASCAR Grand National Series race at this event before retiring.

Individual race earnings ranged from the winner's share of $25,415 ($ when adjusted for inflation) to the last-place finisher's portion of $500 ($ when adjusted for inflation). NASCAR handed out a grand total of $86,285 to all the competitors who qualified for this racing event ($ when adjusted for inflation).

At least ten notable crew chiefs were recorded as officially attending this race; including Ray Hicks, Jake Elder, Glen Wood, Junior Johnson and Banjo Matthews.

Qualifying

Top 20 finishers

References

Notes

Southeastern 500
Southeastern 500
NASCAR races at Bristol Motor Speedway